Muhammadu Bello Kagara  (1890 - 1971) was an educator, a writer and a royalist. He wrote the famous book novel known as Gandoki, the novel is a manuscript written during a literature bureau competition organized in 1933 by Rupert East. his noble book Ganɗoki was considered either first or second book to be published in the entire Northern Nigeria, the first or the second being Ruwan Bagaja by Abubakar Imam.

Early life 
Kagara was born to the family of the Alkali of Kagara, called Shehu Usman. When he was a young boy, his parents fled Kontagora alongside Sarkin Sudan Nagwamatse to prevent themselves from occupying British force, to be under their control.

Education 
Prior to joining the college, he taught at the Zaria Provincial School.

Work 
Later on in his career, he was given a royal title of his father, known as the wali or Daneji of Katsina and he became the traditional chief judge "Alkali" in Katsina native authority

See also 
 Abubakar Imam
 Ruwan Bagaja
 Magana Jari Ce

Bibliography 
 Bobboyi, H., Yakubu, Mahmud.(2006). The Sokoto Caliphate: history and legacies, 1804-2004, 1st Ed. Kaduna, Nigeria:Arewa House. 
 Hamman, Mahmoud, 1950- (2007). The Middle Benue region and the Sokoto Jihad, 1812-1869 : the impact of the establishment of the Emirate of Muri. Kaduna: Arewa House, Ahmadu Bello University. . .
 Usman Muhammad Bugaje. The Tradition of Tajdeed in West Africa: An Overview International Seminar on Intellectual Tradition in the Sokoto Caliphate & Borno. Center for Islamic Studies, University of Sokoto (June 1987)
 Hugh A.S. Johnston . Fulani Empire of Sokoto. Oxford: 1967. .
 S. J. Hogben and A. H. M. Kirk-Greene, The Emirates of Northern Nigeria, Oxford: 1966.
 Kagara, Muhammadu Bello (1981). Sarkin Katsina, Alhaji Muhammadu Dikko, C.B.E., 1865-1944. Zariya: Northern Nigerian Pub. Co. .

References 

People from Katsina State
Hausa people
1890 births
Nigerian writers
Nigerian educators
1971 deaths